Ruff may refer to:

Places
Ruff, Virginia, United States, an unincorporated community
Ruff, Washington, United States, an unincorporated community

Other uses
Ruff (bird) (Calidris pugnax or Philomachus pugnax), a bird in the wader family
Ruff (cards), to play a trump card to a trick in cards
Ruff (clothing), a ruffled collar
Ruff (surname)
Ranik Ultimate Fighting Federation, a Chinese mixed martial arts organization
Real Ulster Freedom Fighters, a loyalist paramilitary organisation in Northern Ireland
Australian herring or ruff, a fish
USS Ruff (AMc-59), a coastal minesweeper laid down in 1940
Ruff, a percussion rudiment similar to the drag
Ruff, a 2015 album by Born Ruffians
Ruff, a fictional cat on The Ruff & Reddy Show
Ruff, a fictional dog in Dennis the Menace

See also
 Ruff and Honours, a 17th-century card game
 Ruff-Ruff, Tweet and Dave, an American children's CGI animated television series
 Ruff Ruffman, the animated dog host of Fetch! With Ruff Ruffman
 Ruff Ryders Entertainment, an American hip hop record label
 Ruff Ryders Indy
 "Ruff Ryders' Anthem", a song by DMX
 USS Ruff, a list of ships

Animal common name disambiguation pages